"The Set Up (You Don't Know)" is a song performed by American rapper Obie Trice, featuring vocals from singer Nate Dogg, released as the third and final single from Trice's debut studio album, Cheers. The track was produced by Dr. Dre.

Background
An official remix of "The Set Up (You Don't Know)" was released as a B-side to the official CD single. The track features, as well as Nate Dogg, appearances from Lloyd Banks, Jadakiss and Redman. The remix was labeled the "Dr. Dre Remix" and was entirely produced by Dre. Jadakiss would later feud with Banks and his group G-Unit after 50 Cent released the song "Piggy Bank", which attacked Jadakiss and Fat Joe for collaborating with 50's rival Ja Rule.

Music video
The video for "The Set Up (You Don't Know)" features Trice being put 'under the spell' of a lady, who encourages him to steal a lot of money. Little does he realize, it's a setup, and he gets shot in order for her to get away the money. But as Karma would have it, she gets shot and the money gets stolen from her. The video ends with Obie getting up, being thankful for wearing a bulletproof vest. Other than Obie Trice and Nate Dogg, the video features Mýa acting as the charming lady, as well as brief cameo appearances by D12 and Warren G at the very beginning.

Track listing
CD single

Notes
 signifies a co-producer.

Charts

References

Obie Trice songs
Nate Dogg songs
2004 singles
Song recordings produced by Dr. Dre
Shady Records singles
2003 songs
Songs written by Dr. Dre
Songs written by Mike Elizondo
Song recordings produced by Mike Elizondo
Songs written by Nate Dogg